Minnenooka is a rural locality in the City of Greater Geraldton, in the Mid West region of Western Australia. The locality is named for Minnenooka Station, established by Captain George Faulkner Wilkinson (68th Durham Light Infantry) in 1868.

See also
 Harold Arthur Faulkner Wilkinson

References

Mid West (Western Australia)
Towns in Western Australia